Michele Scozia (25 November 1928 – 18 November 1995) was an Italian politician who served as Deputy (1979–1983) and Mayor of Salerno (1985–1987).

References

1928 births
1995 deaths
Mayors of Salerno
Deputies of Legislature VIII of Italy